Ezra Miller (May 12, 1812 – July 9, 1885) was a member of the Wisconsin State Senate and the New Jersey Senate.

Miller was born in Bergen County, New Jersey.

In 1833, he joined the 2nd New York Militia. Miller married his wife, Amanda, in May 1841. They had three children and moved to Magnolia, Wisconsin. In 1851, he was commissioned a colonel in the 8th Wisconsin Militia.

In 1863, he was granted the first in a series of patents for railroad couplers which came to be known as the Miller Platform.

Miller died on July 9, 1885, in Mahwah, New Jersey.

Political career
Miller was a member of the Wisconsin State Senate from the 17th district from 1853 to 1854. Additionally, he was a justice of the peace in Magnolia and Postmaster of Janesville, Wisconsin. Miller joined the New Jersey Senate in 1884. He was a Democrat.

References

External links

Politicians from Bergen County, New Jersey
Politicians from Janesville, Wisconsin
Democratic Party Wisconsin state senators
Democratic Party New Jersey state senators
Wisconsin postmasters
American justices of the peace
Military personnel from Wisconsin
1812 births
1885 deaths
19th-century American politicians
19th-century American judges